This is a list of the Europarade number-one singles of 1981.

1981 record charts
Lists of number-one songs in Europe